The Pixar Image Computer is a graphics computer originally developed by the Graphics Group, the computer division of Lucasfilm, which was later renamed Pixar. Aimed at commercial and scientific high-end visualization markets, such as medicine, geophysics and meteorology, the original machine was advanced for its time, but sold poorly.

History

Creation 
When George Lucas recruited people from NYIT in 1979 to start their Computer Division, the group was set to develop digital optical printing, digital audio, digital non-linear editing and computer graphics. Computer graphics quality was just not good enough due to technological limitations at the time. The team then decided to solve the problem by starting a hardware project, building what they would call the Pixar Image Computer, a machine with more computational power that was able to produce images with higher resolution.

Availability 
About three months after their acquisition by Steve Jobs on February 3, 1986, the computer became commercially available for the first time, and was aimed at commercial and scientific high-end visualization markets, such as medical imaging, geophysics, and meteorology. The machine sold for $135,000, but also required a $35,000 workstation from Sun Microsystems or Silicon Graphics (in total). The original machine was well ahead of its time and generated many single sales, for labs and research. However, the system did not sell in quantity.

In 1987, Pixar redesigned the machine to create the P-II second generation machine, which sold for $30,000. In an attempt to gain a foothold in the medical market, Pixar donated ten machines to leading hospitals and sent marketing people to doctors' conventions. However, this had little effect on sales, despite the machine's ability to render CAT scan data in 3D to show perfect images of the human body. Pixar did get a contract with the manufacturer of CAT Scanners, which sold 30 machines. By 1988 Pixar had only sold 120 Pixar Image Computers.

In 1988, Pixar began the development of the PII-9, a nine slot version of the low cost P-II. This machine was coupled with a very early RAID model, a high performance bus, a hardware image decompression card, 4 processors (called Chaps or channel processors), very large memory cards (VME sized card full of memory), high resolutions video cards with 10-bit DACs which were programmable for a variety of frame rates and resolutions, and finally an overlay board which ran NeWS, as well as the 9 slot chassis. A full-up system was quite expensive, as the 3 GiB RAID was $300,000 alone. At this time in history most file systems could only address 2 GiB of disk. This system was aimed at high-end government imaging applications, which were done by dedicated systems produced by the aerospace industry and which cost a million dollars a seat. The PII-9 and the associated software became the prototype of the next generation of commercial "low cost" workstations.

Demise and legacy 
In 1990, the Pixar Image Computer was defining the state-of-the-art in commercial image processing. Despite this, the government decided that the per-seat cost was still too high for mass deployment and to wait for the next generation systems to achieve cost reductions. This decision was the catalyst for Pixar to lay off its hardware engineers and sell the imaging business. There were no high volume buyers in any industry. Fewer than 300 Pixar Image Computers were ever sold.

The Pixar computer business was sold to Vicom Systems in 1990 for $2,000,000. Vicom Systems filed for Chapter 11 within a year afterwards.

Many of the lessons learned from the Pixar Image Computer made it into the Low Cost Workstation (LCWS) and Commercial Analyst Workstation (CAWS) program guidelines in the early and mid 1990s. The government mass deployment that drove the PII-9 development occurred in the late 1990s, in a program called Integrated Exploitation Capability (IEC).

Design 
The P-II could have two Channel Processors, or Chaps. The chassis could hold 4 cards. The PII-9 could hold 9 cards (4 Chaps, 2 video processors, 2 Off Screen Memory (OSM) cards, and an Overlay Board for the NeWS windowing system). NeWS was extended to control the image pipeline for roaming, image comparison, and stereo image viewing.

Each Chap is a 4-way parallel (RGBA) image computer. This was a SIMD architecture, which was good for imagery and video applications. It processed four image channels in parallel, one for red, one for green, one for blue, and one for the alpha channel (whose inventors have connections to Pixar). Images were stored with 12 bits per color channel (or 48 bits per pixel). The 12-bit data represented an unusual (for today) fixed-point format that ranged from -1.5 to 2.5 using 2 bits for the integer portion, meaning the range from 0 to 1 had 10 bit accuracy.

A Unix host machine was generally needed to operate it (to provide a keyboard and mouse for user input). The system could communicate image data externally over an 80M per second "Yapbus" or a 2M per second multibus to other hosts, data sources, or disks, and had a performance measured equivalent to 200 VUPS, or 200 times the speed of a VAX-11/780.

Use 
Walt Disney Feature Animation, whose parent company later purchased Pixar in 2006, used dozens of the Pixar Image Computers for their Computer Animation Production System (CAPS) and was using them in production up through Pocahontas in 1995.

References

External links 
 

Computer workstations
Pixar
SIMD computing